Eurynome may refer to:

Eurynome, name of multiple figures in Greek mythology
Eurynome (Oceanid), an archaic divine figure
Eurynome (crab), a genus of crab in the family Pisidae
Eurynome, a genus of moth
 Eurynome albella, a synonym for Elachista dasycara
79 Eurynome, an asteroid
 Eurydome (moon), moon of jupiter